Moorcroft may refer to:

Moorcroft, a British pottery manufacturer
Moorcroft (surname)
Moorcroft, Wyoming, a town in the United States
Moorcroft pear, also known as the Stinking Bishop pear
Moorcroft 96, a white extremist group against non-whites in baseball, mostly an anti-hispanic group

See also
Jean Moorcroft Wilson a British academic and writer